Ryohei "Ron" Tsutsui (born July, 1977 in Tokyo, Japan) is a Japanese film producer. In December, 2006, he set up his own film production company Trixta Co., Ltd. in Yokohama, Japan in December 2006.

Filmography

Kokoro (2007)
Konjaku Monogatari: The New Edition (2007)

References

External links

Company Website

Japanese film producers
Living people
People from Tokyo
1977 births